Gennady Vasilyevich Potapenko (Mar 25, 1894 – June, 1979) was an American radio astronomer of Russian origin.

After the signal discoveries made by Karl Jansky in the mid-1930s, Potapenko (then a Cambridge physicist), along with Caltech physicist Donald Folland and Palomar telescope designer Russell Porter, attempted further researches in 'star static' in 1936. They were able to confirm Jansky's results with a loop antenna, then a single wire, but were unable to secure adequate funding to continue.

See also
 Grote Reber

References

Further reading
  Reber, G. & Greenstein, J. L., Radio-frequency investigations of astronomical interest. The Observatory, Vol. 67, p. 15-26 (1947)
  Caltech archives; photos, papers

1894 births
1979 deaths
American astronomers
Emigrants from the Russian Empire to the United Kingdom
British emigrants to the United States
Fellows of the American Physical Society